Brian Clarke  (born 2 July 1953) is a British painter, architectural artist and printmaker, known for his large-scale stained glass and mosaic projects, symbolist paintings, set designs, and collaborations with major figures in Modern and contemporary architecture.

Born to a working-class family in the north of England, and a full-time art student on scholarship by age 13, Clarke came to prominence in the late 1970s as a painter and figure of the Punk movement and designer of stained glass. By the early 1980s he had become a major figure in international contemporary art, the subject of several television documentaries and a café society regular. He is known for his architectonic art, prolific output in various media, friendships with key cultural figures, and polemical lectures and interviews.

His practice in architectural and autonomous stained glass, often on a monumental scale, has led to successive innovation and invention in the development of the medium. This includes the creation of stained glass without lead and the subsequent pioneering of a 'dramatically enhanced Pointillism' in glass, as well as the creation of sculptural stained glass works, analogous to collage, made primarily or entirely of lead. The latter two advances are described as having taken stained glass as an art form to its zero-point in each direction: absolute transparency and complete opacity.

A lifelong exponent of the integration of art and architecture, his architectural collaborations include work with Zaha Hadid, Norman Foster, Arata Isozaki, Oscar Niemeyer, I. M. Pei, César Pelli, and Renzo Piano. He served a seven-year term as chairman of The Architecture Foundation and served on the Design Review Committee of the Commission for Architecture and the Built Environment. His artistic collaborations have included work with David Bailey, Hugh Hudson, Malcolm McLaren, and with Linda McCartney and Paul McCartney.

Early life and education
Brian Clarke was born in Oldham, Lancashire, to Edward Ord Clarke, a coal miner, and Lilian Clarke (née Whitehead), a cotton spinner. Raised in a family familiar with Spiritualism – his maternal grandmother was a notable local medium – Clarke attended a Spiritualist Lyceum throughout his childhood and was considered  'sensitive', gaining a reputation locally as a 'boy medium'. 

As a young boy, he visited York Minster on a school trip and was overwhelmed by the beauty of the stained glass and by the coloured transilluminations cast across the medieval masonry. This prompted a lifelong fascination with the medium of stained glass. Aged 12, he applied for a place in the last intake of an education scheme existing in the north of England to enable artistically promising children to leave their secondary school and become full-time art students. Ultimately, he was awarded a scholarship to the Oldham School of Arts and Crafts. In place of a standard curriculum, he principally studied the arts and design, learning drawing, heraldry, pictorial composition, colour theory, pigment mixing and calligraphy, among other subjects. Considered a prodigy, by the age of 16 Clarke had mastered the orthodoxies of academic life drawing. In 1968, he and his family moved to Burnley and, too young at 15 to gain entrance to Burnley College of Art, he lied about his age and was accepted on the strength of his previous work.

In 1970, Clarke enrolled in the Architectural Stained Glass course at North Devon College of Art and Design, graduating from the Diploma in Design with a first class distinction. In 1974, he was awarded the prestigious Winston Churchill Memorial Travelling Fellowship to study medieval and contemporary stained glass in Italy, France, and West Germany. The trip reinforced for him the relevance of the medium in the modern period. He was deeply inspired by the German post-war stained glass artists, especially Johannes Schreiter, who had brought an emotional intensity to the medium. He was also affected by the deeply collaborative relationship between stained glass artists and architects and how this led to more integrated works of art, with stained glass impacting the surrounding space. This influenced Clarke's architectural vision for stained glass. Clarke received the Churchill Extension Fellowship to study art in architecture in the United States, where he befriended and connected with the art of Robert Rauschenberg, Jasper Johns, and Andy Warhol.

Work 
In his career, Clarke has advanced new approaches across a range of mediums including stained glass, mosaic, collage, painting and drawing. He is recognised as being instrumental in bringing critical attention to the medium of stained glass and revealing its relevance to the present day through both his practice of the medium and through exhibitions and writings on the subject.

From the beginning of his career, Clarke has had an architectural vision for stained glass. Always responsive to the building and surrounding context, this vision came to fruition in his later collaborations with world-renowned architects.

1970s

Clarke received his first commission for a stained glass at age 17. However, his suite of 20 windows for the Church of St Lawrence, Longridge (1975) is considered his first mature work. Here, the use of transparent glass has a Pop Art sensibility; the 'see through’ panes embrace the everyday by letting the real world in. In 1976, Clarke received a large-scale commission from the University of Nottingham to produce 45 paintings, vestments, and a series of stained glass windows for a multi-faith chapel in the Queen's Medical Centre. One of the largest public art commissions of the decade, the process of design and installation was filmed by the BBC as material for a documentary.

In the early years of his career, most of Clarke's work was for religious buildings. However, by 1978 his relationship with the Church had become untenable, as his designs were constantly being modified. The ending of this relationship freed Clarke to create stained glass for secular contexts and advance the medium as social art. Throughout this period, Clarke was active in bringing attention to stained glass and promoting it as a modern medium. In 1975, he organised the travelling exhibition Glass Art One, which featured secular, autonomous stained glass panels inspired in part by Japanese-landscape painting. Later, he co-curated GLASS/LIGHT, an extensive survey of twentieth-century stained glass, with British war artist John Piper and art historian Martin Harrison, in collaboration with the artist Marc Chagall as part of the 1978 Festival of the City of London. Clarke also produced the book Architectural Stained Glass,a polemical collection of essays. 

In his painting, Clarke developed a strictly abstract Constructivist language of geometric signs; often his work had an underlying grid structure made from repetitions and variations on the cross. In later years, he would disrupt the grid with free-flowing amorphic forms. In 1977 Punk hit the UK, which had a deep impact on Clarke. He connected with Vivienne Westwood and Malcolm McLaren and later collaborated as a designer on their aborted zine Chicken, whose creation was funded by EMI and filmed by BBC's Arena. He also expressed Punk's nihilistic energy in the 1977 series of paintings, ‘Dangerous Visions’ (1977). Around the same time, Clarke became friends with the physical chemist Lord Snow. After Snow's death, he made a tributary portfolio of screenprints; their title, The Two Cultures referenced Snow's influential 1959 Rede Lecture on the perceived gulf between the humanities and sciences. In 1983 the Tate acquired an edition of The Two Cultures. 

Between 1978 and 1979, the BBC filmed Clarke's studio practice and life for an hour-long BBC Omnibus documentary, Brian Clarke: The Story So Far. Millions watched the documentary in the UK, and the BBC recorded multiple viewer complaints. The programme and subsequent press coverage, including Clarke's appearance on the cover of Vogue, photographed by Robert Mapplethorpe, brought him to broader public attention. Later in 1979, Clarke became a presenter on the BBC2 arts programme Mainstream and the BBC Radio 4 programme Kaleidescope, conducting interviews with figures including Brassaï, Andy Warhol, John Lennon, and Elisabeth Lutyens. He also gave Sheffield band The Human League their first television appearance.

1980s

In the 1980s Clarke was instrumental in bringing stained glass into the public sphere. He received his first international commission for paintings, a wooden construction, and a suite of stained glass windows for the Olympus European Headquarters Building in Hamburg, completed in 1981. Marking a major shift in his own practice and breaking with tradition, he had the windows made at a studio in Germany. The experience of their immersive colour prompted critics to describe them as the Colour Field of stained glass. Another development in this work is Clarke's liberation of the lead line from being a purely structural element: where the lead breaks free, it takes on an expressive quality. In the same year, receiving a commission from the Government of Saudi Arabia for the Royal Mosque of King Khalid International Airport, Clarke studied Islamic ornament at the Quran schools in Fez. Following this, in 1984, the architectural practice Derek Latham and Co. asked Clarke to collaborate on the refurbishment of Henry Currey's Grade II listed Thermal Baths in Buxton. Satisfying his social ambitions for the medium, he enclosed the former Victorian spa in a barrel-vaulted skin of stained glass, bathing the public space “in an immense blue light”. It is one of Clarke's earliest works to have been designed to have a nocturnal presence.
 

In 1988, architect Arata Isozaki approached Clarke to collaborate on the Lake Sagami Building in Yamanishi. Clarke designed a composition of stained glass for the central lantern and a series of interrelated skylights that referenced elements of Isozaki's building. In the same period, Clarke collaborated with Norman Foster and his architectural practice Foster + Partners to design stained glass for Stansted Airport's new terminal building. For the first time in the history of stained glass, computer-assisted design was utilised in its visualisation and design. Partly for security reasons, the design couldn't be used. The final commission was for two friezes and a 6-metre high tower of stained glass. While their abstract, constructivist forms resonated Foster's language, Clarke has recently expressed how the medieval technology of lead and stained glass was at odds with the material qualities of High-tech architecture. An urge to resolve this conflict later spurred Clarke to embrace the most cutting-edge glass technology.

Equally experimental across other mediums, Clarke's painting practice was also inspired by technology. Noticing the similarity between the reticular, Constructivist-derived symbols that dominated his work and the light-metering computergrams from Olympus OM System cameras, he produced a series of technology-related paintings, including Time Lag Zero for the headquarters of Olympus Optical (UK). During this period, Clarke produced the cover painting for Paul McCartney's solo album Tug of War, designing the cover with Linda McCartney. He also created the stage designs for Paul McCartney's World Tour (1989-90).

1990s
Continuing to work collaboratively with leading architects, Clarke started to challenge the traditional containment of stained glass within a frame and fashion entire facades from glass. When Future Systems (the architectural practice of Jan Kaplický and Amanda Levete) asked Clarke to help them design The Glass Dune (1992), he proposed an internal ‘skin of art’ for their innovative boomerang-shaped building, which was never realised. Collaborating later with expressionist architect Will Alsop on the design of Hôtel du Département des Bouches du Rhône (which became known as Le Grand Bleu), Clarke clad the building in an Yves Klein blue glass. A landmark in the city of Marseille, the building is now considered a major work of late 20th century architecture. 

Desiring lighter and more expansive fields of glass, Clarke continued searching for new technologies. Working with architect Zaha Hadid on a proposal for the Spittelau Viaducts Housing Project, Vienna, he developed a new type of mouth-blown glass, which he christened 'Zaha-Glas'. Although this project was never realised, the newly-developed 'Zaha-Glas'  was first used architecturally in Clarke's scheme for the ceiling of Pfizer World Headquarters in New York, a landmark architectural art project that connected 42nd and 43rd Streets in Manhattan. Working with Foster on the design for the Al Faisaliyah Centre, Riyadh, Saudi Arabia (installed 1999), Clarke abandoned the medieval technology of glass and supportive lead entirely and conceived a novel solution that involved firing a ceramic frit glaze into float glass. The new glass had a lightness that matched Norman Foster's High-tech building. Clarke, however, continued to use traditional, medieval technologies in other architectural contexts.  

Clarke continued to be active in other mediums in addition to stained glass. In 1993, he created the set designs for Paul McCartney's New World Tour (1993); one of the sets was a collage of stained glass through the ages. This marked a major endorsement of the medium of stained glass by a modern pop culture icon. The following year, Clarke had a joint show with Linda McCartney. The exhibition, Collaborations, showed works by both artists and collaborative pieces in which McCartney's photos were silkscreened onto stained glass.

In 1998 the English High Court severed all ties between Francis Bacon's former gallery, Marlborough Fine Art, and the Estate of Francis Bacon. Clarke was appointed sole executor of the Estate of Francis Bacon, acting on behalf of Bacon's heir John Edwards. Clarke transferred representation of Francis Bacon to the Tony Shafrazi Gallery in New York, where an exhibition was mounted of seventeen previously-unseen Bacon paintings recovered from his studio. Clarke brought a second court case against Marlborough Fine Art, alleging that the gallery had underpaid Bacon for his work, asserted undue influence over him, and failed to account for up to 33 of his paintings. Following Edwards' diagnosis with lung cancer in 2002, the litigation was settled out of court, with each side paying its own costs. During the legal process an undisclosed number of Bacon's paintings were recovered from Marlborough, and "vast quantities of correspondence and documents relating to the life of the artist were handed over by the gallery". 

In 1998, Edwards and Clarke donated the contents of Bacon's studio at 7 Reece Mews, London, left untouched since Bacon's death, to the Hugh Lane, the Dublin City Gallery.  What followed was a unique conservation project. A decision was taken to preserve the studio as it stood, and a team of archaeologists, art historians, conservators, and curators were involved in the move from London to Dublin. The locations of over 7,000 items were documented, and in Dublin, the studio was rebuilt using all the original doors, flooring, walls, and ceiling, and the items were placed exactly as they were left. The studio opened to the public in 2001, accompanied by the first-ever database to list the contents of an artist's studio.

2000s
Continuing to advance his architectural vision for stained glass, in 2015 Clarke orchestrated the site-specific exhibition Lamina at the Gagosian Gallery, London, where floor to ceiling stained glass depicting golden leaves transformed the gallery space and immersed the visitors illuminated natural forms. Nature became a central theme for Clarke's work in these years. In an interview, Clarke acknowledged feeling close to Henri Matisse, who had worked in stained glass and whose work often glorified the wonders of nature. Nature also inspired Clarke's stained glass and ceramic works at Mall Cottages in West London. Clarke worked with Norman Foster on the Palace of Peace and Reconciliation, a landmark building in Nur-Sultan, Kazakhstan, built to house the triennial Congress of Leaders of World and Traditional Religions. Clarke's 9,700 square expanse of stained glass crowns the apex of the pyramid (installed 2006), featuring imagery of soaring doves. 

In another example of Clarke breaking the medieval relationship between glass and lead, in the 2000s he took the radical step to inverse their relationship and began fashioning works entirely of lead. In these autonomous lead works, Clarke often uses the somber weightiness of lead to explore darker themes like mortality. His leadwork Don't Forget the Lamb (2014) is a memorial to his late mother.
In this period, nature inspired Clarke's work in other mediums as well. His drawings of flowers use negative space as an expressive element, isolating the flowers in empty space with his signature, nervy line. This is seen in his later series, 'Night Orchids', exhibited at PACE Gallery in 2016. Clarke's collages are equally experimental; the carefully chosen, often torn, fragments and chalk drawings build an image that attempts to capture the essence of the flower depicted. In a radical gesture, Clarke brought the language of collage to stained glass in a wrap-around window at Peel Cottage (installed 2009), where he incorporated fragments of medieval glass within a contemporary design.

2010s to present 
In 2010, Clarke was commissioned to design stained windows for the new Papal Chapel of the Apostolic Nunciature, the diplomatic embassy of the Holy See to Great Britain, for the 2010 visit of Pope Benedict XVI to the United Kingdom, the first-ever state visit made by a pope to Britain. The exhibitionThe Art of Light (2018) in Norwich highlighted Clarke's free-standing glass panels. While their folding structures draw inspiration from Japanese folding screens, they explore a new context for stained glass, no longer confined to the fabric of a building, but nevertheless having a strong architectural impact on whatever space they inhabit. The subject matter of these panels is diverse: many depict flowers and nature's opulence in vivid colour, but there are also images of intense grief and Pop-inspired subject matter. A Pop sensibility also runs through his Caryatids panels (2002), which depict muscular young men in beachwear by the sea. The work received criticism when it was shown at Christie's, London in 2011, reflective of the traditionalist values that surround the medium of stained glass.

In 2015, Clarke curated A Strong Sweet Smell of Incense: A Portrait of Robert Fraser, an exhibition held at the Royal Academy of Arts in London, in association with Pace Gallery, together with author Harriet Vyner (whose 'cult biography' of Fraser, Groovy Bob, Clarke had contributed to). The 2014 solo exhibition Spitfires and Primroses with the Pace Gallery, juxtaposed two recent series of works, pairing oil paintings of the Second World War aircraft, arranged in a heraldic semé, with watercolours of English primroses. The show revealed an underlying disquiet to Clarke's botanical imagery. This aspect resonated later in his paintings of poppies, which formed the exhibition Vespers at Phillips, London in 2021.

In 2020, it was announced that a new Blue Coat School was to be built in Oldham, Clarke's hometown, named the Brian Clarke Church of England Academy, to provide free school places to 1,200 pupils. The Academy was granted planning permission in April 2021, with construction due to be completed in 2023.

Selected projects

Selected realised projects

Selected unrealised projects

Recognition and roles

 1983 - 2020: Council Member, Winston Churchill Memorial Trust  
 1989 - present: Fellow of the Royal Society of Arts
 1992: Visiting Professor, Centre del Vidre, Barcelona
 1993 - present: Honorary Fellow of the Royal Institute of British Architects
 1994: Visiting Professor of Architectural Art, Bartlett Institute of Architecture, UCL 
 1995 - 2008: Trustee, The Stained Glass Museum, Ely
 1998 - present: Chairman and sole executor of The Estate of Francis Bacon
 2000 - 2005: Board member, Design Review Committee for the Commission of Architecture and the Built Environment
 2001 - present: Governor of Capital City Academy
 2001 - present: Trustee, The Lowe Educational Charitable Foundation
 2002 - 2013: Trustee, The Architecture Foundation 
 2007 - 2013: Chairman of The Architecture Foundation
 2007 - 2020: Trustee, Winston Churchill Memorial Trust  
 2016 - present: Chairman and trustee of the Zaha Hadid Foundation

Awards 

 1974: Winston Churchill Memorial Trust Fellowship
 1975: Churchill Fellowship Extension
 1988: Europa Nostra Award: Gold Medal (Cavendish Arcade, Buxton) 
 1991: Leeds Award for Architecture (Victoria Quarter); Civic Trust Award (Victoria Quarter)
 1996: Award for Fine Architecture, Heidelberg
 2007: Honorary D.Litt, Huddersfield University
 2012: Honorary Liveryman, Worshipful Company of Glaziers and Master Glass Painters
 2018: Doctor of Humane Letters, Virginia Theological Seminary
 2021  Honorary Fellow, Arts University Bournemouth

Selected exhibitions

Television and film
 BBC Omnibus – Brian Clarke: The Story So Far. Diana Lashmore, BBC One, 15 March 1979.
 Mainstream (presenter). BBC Two, 1979.
 Time Lag Zero: Impressions of Brian Clarke. Celebration, Granada Television, 1980.
 Linda McCartney: Behind the Lens (contributor). Nicholas Caxton, Arena, BBC One, 1992.
 Architecture of the Imagination - The Window (contributor). Mark Kidel, BBC Two, 1994.
 Architecture of the Imagination - The Stairway (contributor). Mark Kidel, BBC Two, 1994.
 Omnibus – Norman Foster (contributor). Mark Kidel, BBC One, 1995.
 Eye over Prague/Jan Kaplický – Oko Nad Prahou (contributor). Olga Špátová, 2010.
 Frank Brangwyn: Stained Glass – a catalogue (contributor). Malachite Art Films/Libby Horner, 2010.
 Colouring Light: Brian Clarke - An Artist Apart. With contributions from Sir Peter Cook, Dame Zaha Hadid, and Martin Harrison. Mark Kidel, BBC Four, 2011.

Bibliography

Publications
 Architectural Stained Glass, Brian Clarke. With contributions by John Piper, Patrick Reyntiens, Johannes Schreiter and Robert Sowers. Architectural Record Books, McGraw Hill, New York, 1979. 
 WORK, Brian Clarke. Steidl Verlag, 2009. 
 Christophe, Brian Clarke. Steidl Verlag, 2009.
 A Strong Sweet Smell of Incense: A Portrait of Robert Fraser, Brian Clarke, with Harriet Vyner. Pace Gallery London, 2015.

Contributions
 David Bailey's Trouble and Strife. Thames and Hudson, 1980.
 Into The Silent Land. Yoshihiko Ueda, Kyoto Shoin, 1990.
 Glasbilder Johannes Schreiter: 1987 – 1997, 'A cry in the wilderness'. Beispiel Darmstadt, 1997.
 Groovy Bob: The Life and Times of Robert Fraser. Harriet Vyner, Faber & Faber, 1999.
 Paul McCartney: Paintings, Bulfinch, 2000. 
 Ludwig Schaffrath (1924-2011) – an appreciation, The Journal of Stained Glass, Vol. XXXIV. The British Society of Master Glass Painters, 2010. 
 Burne-Jones: Vast acres and fleeting ecstasies, The Journal of Stained Glass, Vol. XXXV. The British Society of Master Glass Painers, 2011.

Monographs and catalogues

Gallery

Notes

References

External links 

 Brian Clarke's official website
 
 
 
 
 Brian Clarke in the Tate Gallery collection
 
 

Living people
English artists
English stained glass artists and manufacturers
People from Oldham
1953 births
20th-century English painters
21st-century English painters
21st-century English male artists
English male painters
Abstract painters
English contemporary art
English curators
English mixed media artists
English watercolourists
English printmakers
British scenic designers
English ceramicists
English sculptors
British glass artists
Collage artists
British curators
20th-century English male artists
Brian Clarke